Newton Local High School is a public high school in Pleasant Hill, Ohio. It is the only high school in the Newton Local School District.

Newton High School is the center of Pleasant Hill, Ohio, and is located at 201 N. Long St.  The old school building was constructed in the 1920s, but was demolished in 2010, and a new one was built in its place.

Ohio High School Athletic Association State Championships

 Girls Softball - 2010

External links 
 District Website

Notes and references

High schools in Miami County, Ohio
Public high schools in Ohio